Jincheng Plaza East is a station on Line 18 of the Chengdu Metro in China.

References

Railway stations in Sichuan
Railway stations in China opened in 2020
Chengdu Metro stations